Timmis was an innovative design of double coiled springs, originally used for railway rolling stock, such as on the Barsi Light Railway c1889, as formulated by Everard Calthrop (1857–1927).

Inventor 
The inventor was Illius Augustus Timmis

Patent 

US Patent 432341 was filled in 1889 and published in 1890.

See also 
 Bogie as used with railway rolling stock.
 Coil spring
 Leaf spring - an older and simpler system of springs

References 

1890 introductions
Automotive suspension technologies
English inventions
Springs (mechanical)